La encrucijada may refer to:
 Films
 The Crossroads (1952 film) (La encrucijada), a 1952 Argentine film
 The Crossroads (1960 film) (La encrucijada), a 1960 French-Spanish film
 Places
 La Encrucijada Biosphere Reserve, Mexico
 La Encrucijada transport hub, Venezuela

See also
The Crossroads (disambiguation)